Nixon Alexei McNamara McLean (born 20 July 1973) is a West Indian cricketer from St. Vincent and the Grenadines. He featured in the role of a right-arm fast-medium bowler who played both Tests and ODIs for the West Indies. McLean also featured for the Windward Islands, Hampshire, KwaZulu-Natal, Somerset and the Canterbury Wizards in his cricketing career.

Playing career
He made his ODI debut for the Windies in 1996, notching figures of two for 33, against Australia at Melbourne. During 1998 McLean joined up with English side Hampshire where he stayed for a sum of two seasons. With Hampshire, he picked up 51 limited overs wickets along with 108 first class wickets which came at an average of under 30. McLean was also an essential part, as the tournament's leading wicket taker, of the Windward Islands' victorious 2000-01 Red Stripe Bowl campaign.

He later joined up, in 2001, with South African club KwaZulu-Natal. During his debut season he picked up 44 first class wickets at and average of 16.13 and 15 List A wickets at an average of 15.33. He thus played an essential part in Natal winning both the Standard Bank Cup and the Supersport Series, South Africa's domestic ODI and four day tournaments, in that 2001–02 season. He then stayed with the club for another successive season.
McLean's impressive performances for Natal earned him a place in the Windies' World Cup 2003 squad.

During 2003 McLean joined up with Somerset, where he stayed for three seasons. With a best showing of six for 79, he eventually claimed 120 first class wickets at an average of 29.22 in 33 matches for that club. He later joined New Zealand side Canterbury Wizards in 2005.

Later work
After calling an end to his playing days, McLean joined the board of the West Indies Retired Players Foundation, a foundation designed to improve the game on a domestic level through the help of former players. McLean also serves as the current vice president of the West Indies Players' Association.

References

1973 births
Living people
Saint Vincent and the Grenadines cricketers
West Indies One Day International cricketers
West Indies Test cricketers
Hampshire cricketers
KwaZulu-Natal cricketers
Somerset cricketers
Windward Islands cricketers
Canterbury cricketers
Cricketers at the 2003 Cricket World Cup
People from Saint George Parish, Saint Vincent and the Grenadines